Blossom Book House is an independent bookstore selling new and used books in Bengaluru, India.  The stores are located on Church Street, Bengaluru. Apart from books written in English, the bookstore also sells books written in Kannada, Tamil, Telugu and Hindi.

History
Blossom Book House was created in 2001, by Mayi Gowda, former engineer, who quit his job to start selling books on MG Road, Bengaluru.
 
The original store of 200 sq ft has grown to a three-storey building and now measures 3500 sqft.

More recently, Blossom Book House has entered the online market with the launch of their online bookstore, confident that it will help the store regain the losses due to the rise of online shopping retailers like Flipkart.

Achievement
With 200,000 books in the store, Blossom Book house is the largest second hand bookstore in India.

References

External links

http://overheardatblossoms.tumblr.com/

Bookstores of India